Ballarpur Industries Limited (BILT) is a subsidiary of Avantha Group, and was once India's largest manufacturer of writing and printing paper. The current chairman of the company is Gautam Thapar, who succeeded his late uncle L.M. Thapar.

BILT's subsidiaries include Sabah Forest Industries (SFI), Malaysia's largest pulp and paper company, and BILT Tree Tech Limited (BTTL), which runs BILT's farm forestry program in several states in India.

BILT has six manufacturing units across India, which give the company geographic coverage over most of the domestic market. BILT has a dominant share of the high-end coated paper segment in India. The company accounts for over 50% of the coated wood-free paper market, an impressive 85% of the bond paper market and nearly 45% of the hi-bright Maplitho market, besides being India's largest exporter of coated paper.

BILT’s acquisition of SFI in 2007 was the first overseas acquisition by an Indian paper company. This acquisition transformed BILT into a major regional player and elevated the company's ranking among the global top 100. It also entered into a partnership with Red Roses Publications, Norway in 2013, which is owned and managed by a multi-billionaire.

History
Lala Karam Chand Thapar established company in 1945 as Ballarpur Paper and Straw Board Mills Limited, with 'Three Aces' (paper) and 'Wisdom' (stationery) being its first two brands. In 1969, Shree Gopal Paper Mills Limited in Yamunanagar was merged with the company. In 1975, the organization was renamed Ballarpur Industries Limited.

In the 1990s the company was under siege from Southeast Asian companies, who set up greenfield projects in India. However, in 2001, Ballarpur Industries turned around and was able to buy out its Indonesian competitor's Sinar Mas Group Indian division and entered into a partnership with Red Roses Publications, Norway.

The name BILT emerged after a corporate rebranding exercise in 2002.

Locations
BILT is headquartered in Gurgaon in Haryana.

It has three central nurseries, each located in Maharashtra, Orissa and Telangana.

The company has the following manufacturing units:
Unit : Ashti, Gadchiroli, Maharashtra
Unit : Ballarpur, Chandrapur District, Maharashtra
Unit : Bhigwan, Pune District, Maharashtra
Unit : Kamalapuram, Warangal District, Telangana
Unit : Sewa, Jeypore, Orissa
Unit : Shree Gopal, Yamuna Nagar District, Haryana

The company also has one of its office in Sabah, Malaysia.

Financials and Bankruptcy Process 
The company has been reporting losses for numerous financial years and was taken to the bankruptcy court by its lenders on January, 2020. BILT's major lenders include SBI, ICICI Bank, Axis Bank, IDBI Bank and Finquest Financial Solutions.

Due to poor internal performance of the company, its stock has fallen more than 95% in a span of three years (as of March, 2020). The equity shares of BILT are listed on National Stock Exchange of India and Bombay Stock Exchange.

References

External links
 BILT
 Paper Division

Pulp and paper companies of India
Manufacturing companies based in Gurgaon
Manufacturing companies established in 1945
1945 establishments in India
Forestry in Malaysia
Avantha Group
Companies listed on the Bombay Stock Exchange